Lyman Allen House and Barn is a registered historic building near Amanda, Ohio, listed in the National Register on 1976-11-18.

Historic uses 
Single Dwelling
Secondary Structure

Notes 

Houses on the National Register of Historic Places in Ohio
Houses in Fairfield County, Ohio
National Register of Historic Places in Fairfield County, Ohio